Yadavalli Suryanarayana (1888–1939) was an Indian actor and thespian known for his works in Telugu cinema and Telugu theatre. He made his transition from theater to cinema in 1932. He contributed to the Telugu theatre for over three decades.

Early life
Suryanarayana was born in Guntur, Andhra Pradesh in a Telugu Vaidika Brahmin family. He was the eldest son to Yadavalli Ramakrishnayya and Vengamamba. His elder sister Seetha died early. His other siblings were Gopala Krishna, Venkata Subbu Lakshmi and Rama Rao. His father was an officer in the British Government. Coming from an educated family, Suryanarayana successfully completed matriculation, learned Sanskrit and Telugu along with Panchakavyas. He started performing on stage while he was still a student.

Early career
He toured Andhra Pradesh with Mylavaram Balabharati Nataka Samajam of Vijaywada and Seetharamanjaneya Nataka Samajam of Eluru. He portrayed many roles in plays such as Satyavan in Savithri, Rama in Rama Paduka Pattabhishekam, Dushyantudu in Sakunthala, Sarangadhara in Sarangadhara, Arjuna in Gayopakhyanam, Bahuka in Chitranaleeyam, and as Duryodhana in Veni Samharam, Draupadi Vastrapaharanam and Pandava Udyoga Vijayam plays.

Death
He died at the age of 50 in 1939.

Filmography
 1932 : Rama Paduka Pattabhishekam as Rama
 1932 : Sakunthala as Dushyantudu
 1934 : Seeta Kalyanam
 1936 : Draupadi Vastrapaharanam as Duryodhana

References

External links

1888 births
1939 deaths
20th-century Indian male actors
Male actors from Andhra Pradesh
Indian male stage actors
Male actors in Telugu cinema
Indian male film actors
People from Guntur
Male actors in Telugu theatre